Vadim Brînzan (born 23 December 1971) is a former Moldovan politician. He served as Minister of Economy and Infrastructure from 8 June 2019 to 14 November 2019 in the cabinet of Prime Minister Maia Sandu. Anatol Usatîi was appointed as his successor in the cabinet of Prime Minister Ion Chicu.

References 

Living people
1971 births
Place of birth missing (living people)
Moldovan Ministers of Economy
21st-century Moldovan politicians
Moldova State University alumni
Harvard Business School alumni